Jean-Daniel Raulet (born 24 March 1946) is a French former racing driver.

References

1946 births
Living people
French racing drivers
24 Hours of Le Mans drivers
World Sportscar Championship drivers
Place of birth missing (living people)
20th-century French people